Nicolás "Nico" Laprovíttola (born January 31, 1990) is an Argentine professional basketball player for FC Barcelona of the Spanish Liga ACB and the EuroLeague. He is also a member of the Argentina national basketball team. His mother is politician Margarita Stolbizer.

Professional career

Club Atlético Lanús (2007–2013)
Laprovíttola's beginnings in basketball first started with Deportivo Morón, and then at Lanús, when he was 17 years old. In 2007, he made his pro debut with Lanús when the team played in the Argentine 2nd Division. They achieved promotion that season to the top Argentine League. Laprovíttola led his team to the Argentine League Final Series in the 2012–13 season against Regatas Corrientes. But the experience of the opposing team, led by Paolo Quinteros, Federico Kammerichs, and Jerome Meyinsse, was crucial during the series, and the team of Corrientes won the national title. Laprovíttola played for six seasons with Club Atlético Lanús.

Flamengo (2013–2015)
During his preparation for the 2013 FIBA Americas Championship, Laprovíttola spoke about how excited he was that he was going to be playing with Flamengo, to whom he gave several compliments. He was named MVP of the 2014 edition of the FIBA Intercontinental Cup.

Lithuania and Spain (2015–2016)
On August 2, 2015, Laprovíttola signed a one-year deal with the Lithuanian club Lietuvos rytas. On December 31, 2015, he parted ways with Lietuvos rytas and signed with Spanish club Estudiantes through to the end of the 2016–17 season.

San Antonio Spurs (2016)
On September 26, 2016, Laprovíttola signed with the San Antonio Spurs. On November 5, 2016, he scored a season-high 11 points against the Los Angeles Clippers. On December 27, 2016, he was waived by the Spurs. He saw action in 18 games for the Spurs, averaging 3.3 points and 1.6 assists in 9.7 minutes, and spent two days with San Antonio's D-League affiliate, the Austin Spurs, in late November.

Spain and Russia (2017–2020)
On January 18, 2017, Laprovíttola signed with the Spanish club Baskonia for the rest of the season.

On July 7, 2017, Laprovíttola signed a 1+1 deal with Russian club Zenit Saint Petersburg. On January 22, 2018, he left Zenit and signed with Divina Seguros Joventut for the rest of the 2017–18 ACB season.

On August 8, 2018, Laprovíttola signed a one-year deal with Divina Seguros Joventut of the Liga ACB.

On July 9, 2019, Laprovíttola signed a two-year deal with the historic club Real Madrid. On July 1, 2021, Laprovíttola officially parted ways with the Spanish team.

National team career
Laprovíttola played with the junior national team of Argentina at the 2008 FIBA Americas Under-18 Championship in Taiwan, where he won a gold medal and qualified for the 2009 FIBA Under-19 World Championship in New Zealand. Argentina finished in fifth place at the Under-19 World Championship. He also played at the 2011 Pan American Games.

In 2012, Laprovíttola played with the senior men's Argentine national basketball team at the 2012 South American Championship, in Resistencia, where he won the gold medal. After the 2012–13 season, Laprovíttola was selected for the Argentine national team at the FIBA Stanković Cup tournament in China. He was also selected by coach Julio Lamas to represent Argentina at the 2013 FIBA Americas Championship, where he won the bronze medal, the 2014 South American Championship, where he won the silver medal and the 2014 FIBA Basketball World Cup. Laprovíttola also played at the 2015 Pan American Games, at the 2015 FIBA Americas Championship, where he won the silver medal, and at the 2016 Summer Olympics.

In 2019, he participated in the team that won the Pan American gold medal in Lima. He also competed in the 2020 Tokyo Summer Olympics, held during 2021 because of the Covid-19 pandemic, and his highlights included scoring 27 points in Argentina's preliminary round loss to Spain.

In 2022, Laprovittola won the gold medal in the 2022 FIBA AmeriCup held in Recife, Brazil. He was one of Argentina´s starting guards in the tournament.

Career statistics

NBA

Regular season

|-
| align="left" | 
| align="left" | San Antonio
| 18 || 3 || 9.7 || .426 || .370 || 1.000 || .6 || 1.6 || .2 || .1 || 3.3
|- class="sortbottom"
| align="center" colspan="2"| Career
| 18 || 3 || 9.7 || .426 || .370 || 1.000 || .6 || 1.6 || .2 || .1 || 3.3

References

External links

 Nicolás Laprovíttola at acb.com 
 Nicolás Laprovíttola at euroleague.net
 Nicolás Laprovíttola at fiba.com
 Nicolás Laprovíttola at lnb.com.br 
 

1990 births
Living people
2014 FIBA Basketball World Cup players
2019 FIBA Basketball World Cup players
Argentine expatriate basketball people in Brazil
Argentine expatriate basketball people in Lithuania
Argentine expatriate basketball people in Russia
Argentine expatriate basketball people in Spain
Argentine expatriate basketball people in the United States
Argentine men's basketball players
Argentine people of German descent
Argentine people of Italian descent
Basketball players at the 2011 Pan American Games
Basketball players at the 2015 Pan American Games
Basketball players at the 2016 Summer Olympics
Basketball players at the 2019 Pan American Games
Basketball players at the 2020 Summer Olympics
BC Rytas players
BC Zenit Saint Petersburg players
CB Estudiantes players
FC Barcelona Bàsquet players
Flamengo basketball players
Italian expatriate basketball people in Spain
Italian men's basketball players
Italian people of Argentine descent
Joventut Badalona players
Lanús basketball players
Liga ACB players
National Basketball Association players from Argentina
Novo Basquete Brasil players
Olympic basketball players of Argentina
Pan American Games gold medalists for Argentina
Pan American Games medalists in basketball
People from Morón Partido
Point guards
Real Madrid Baloncesto players
San Antonio Spurs players
Saski Baskonia players
Undrafted National Basketball Association players
Medalists at the 2019 Pan American Games
Sportspeople from Buenos Aires Province